An ideas bank is a widely available shared resource, usually a website, where people post, exchange, discuss, and polish new ideas. Some ideas banks are used to develop new inventions or technologies. Many corporations have installed internal ideas banks to gather the input from their employees and improve their ideation process. Some ideas banks employ a voting system to estimate an idea's value. In some cases, ideas banks can be more humor-oriented than their serious counterparts. 

Many ideas banks are provided as free of charge, or set around certain companies in general to work out new inventions. Although ideas are provided by a community of people, problems can arise when people take the ideas from the site and begin developing them. There is no possible way to prove that the idea on the ideas bank was original and not taken from something else.

Innovation

The front end of innovation is quite distinct from the remainder of the innovation process.  When the very best ideas are discovered, they can be managed with a stage gate oriented project management system, where the work flow is defined.  The front end of innovation is commonly referred to as "fuzzy" because it functions best when a collaborative system nurtures chaos, disruption and the serendipitous discovery of ideas.  Most ideas submitted via an electronic suggestion box are limited to incremental innovation (doing things the way we always have but better).  There is nothing wrong with incremental innovation, in fact the ideas leading to projects resulting from incremental innovation typically yield rapid revenue gains or cost savings.  But most organizations are using collaborative idea management systems to get breakthrough or radical innovation (ideas that can be thought of as "out of the box" thinking").

The fuzzy front end of innovation benefits by having a collaborative tool serving as a backbone to nurture an organization's culture of innovation.  Everyone can log into this system, post objects of interest to the other users, search for information, comment on information, discover experts in the organization when needed and as a result everyone is more well informed.  In this sense the collaborative tool serves as a knowledge management system and is very Facebook-like, except everyone is talking about work.  Of course the collaborative tool also accepts the submission of ideas.  The idea management software solution manages these ideas by allowing others to comment on them, shaping the idea further, clustering them with similar ideas (utilizing the idea management software's similarity search capabilities) and accepting some sort of voting scheme in order to score the idea's worth.  Better idea management software systems will use an algorithm to measure the "wisdom of the crowd" gauging social media type activity.  In this instance that means the best ideas are automatically promoted when they get a combination of the most votes, the comments, the most votes on comments, the most views, the most "follows", the most "alerts", the most bookmarks and the most similar ideas posted...all combined in a mathematical formula to determine which idea is best as measured by the group of collaborators working on ideas.

Unsolicited ideas typically lead to incremental innovation.  To get to radical or breakthrough innovation, the idea management system needs to indulge in some strategic guidance by issuing challenges (or campaigns or seeding).  In essence the bottom up grown organizational engagement of a collaborative idea management system is managed a little bit by some top down strategic guidance.  The company is saying "We're glad you're all talking together, now do us a favor and talk about this...". They ask for ideas to address the big issues of the company, for instance "How do we make the company more 'green'".  "What should our next new product be in the US"?  This approach is often known as a corporate innovation programme.

By collaborating, companies can assemble all the smart people in the company to exchange ideas, enhance each other's ideas and have the best ideas be automatically promoted (and you need an automated promotion mechanism in the software because the problem isn't that you won't get enough ideas, the problem is you'll get too many and you don't want someone to have to manually filter through them all).

While idea management led to the installment of corporate social platforms for communication, research shows that focus must be put on the idea communication process. Good ideas need collegial elaboration and motivation, while resources should not be spent on ideas that are not applicable. Idea screening is an activity that will use the idea management platforms to fulful this taslk. Idea screening is an activity that consists of perception (the process of making sense and becoming aware) and judgement (reaching conclusions about what has been perceived). Given that organizations have limited resources, and cannot implement all of the ideas, idea screening acts as a bottleneck during the innovation process.Thus far, research studies have mainly focused on improving the efficiency and effectiveness of idea screening through e.g. crowdsourcing, improving its accuracy, and even developing algorithms that mimic human evaluations. However, this pursuit of technical and procedural optimization has only reinforced the perception of idea screening as a strict decision gate, limiting our understanding of the human side of this phenomenon.

Examples
 As an open ideas bank project, Yle Kipinä, was launched to increase public's involvement in how the Finnish media tax is spent. 
 As part of the adoption of enterprise social software, many companies have decided to use such a portal to allow their employees (on their intra-net) or their customers (on the internet) to collaborate in the process of raising new ideas.
 Idea management software has the sole purpose of raising new ideas—for new products, process improvements, employee welfare or any other corporate use.
 Although not necessarily ideas banks per se, by allowing anyone to edit, wikis allow a group of people to work on information collaboratively. This collaborative writing can continue until all are satisfied with the article or piece of writing, but more often than not contributions continue as visitors add information, improve what is already there, and remove irrelevant or incorrect information.
 Halfbakery is an example of a slightly less serious ideas bank. Users submit ideas, often jokingly, which are then commented on, often jokingly, by other users.
 The Global Ideas Bank is the opposite of Halfbakery in that ideas are proposed seriously, and in some cases actually implemented. It started as a group of inventors in 1985 and became a large organization over several years until it was put online with its current name in 1995.
 Founded in London in 2000, Idea a Day solicits submissions of original ideas from around the world, edits and publishes one considered example every day. A book, The Big Idea Book, comprising 500 of the best ideas, was published by Wiley in 2003.
 In Ecuador, the National Secretariat for Higher Education, Science, Innovation and Technology, launched its own Idea Bank to boost innovation and help local entrepreneurs get some funding and resources. They also posted a set of open source hardware technologies so everybody can use them.
 Betterific gives consumers a platform to offer feedback on how to improve their favorite products and companies and to post their ideas for new products and services. The site's aim is to crowdsource innovation.
 Idea Drop is an idea management software that allows large corporations to collect, develop and manage ideas from their stakeholders. It also allows organisations to share specific challenges and invite employee's ideas on how to solve them.
President of Pakistan announced National Idea Bank in February 2021 
 Howitcouldbedifferent.org is a website to easily see, share, and suggest ideas. The site's aim is to make it easier to access ideas and spread innovation.
IdeaGist is an idea collection and development platform that helps communities in developing ideas from concept to MVP. IdeaGist is the platform used by National Idea Bank Pakistan.

See also
 Crowdsourcing
 Ideation (creative process)
 Q&A website
 Smart mobs
 TED, a conference for "ideas worth spreading".
 The Wisdom of Crowds

References

External links
 
 
 Idea generation
 IdeaMill Idea Bank
 Ecuadorian Idea Bank
 Drawing Ideas Generator
 Self-Sustainability strategies for development initiatives
 Via Interaxion, Social development solutions hub
National Idea Bank, Pakistan
How it could be different

 
Collaboration
Social information processing